Huberantha nitidissima (synonym Polyalthia nitidissima) is a species of tree in the Annonaceae family. It is found in dry seasonal tropical forests and along moist watercourses in Australia (NSW, Queensland, and Northern Territory) and New Caledonia. Maximum height is 18 metres.

References

External links

nitidissima
Annonaceae
Flora of Australia